Old State House or Old Statehouse may refer to:

 Old Colony House, Newport, Rhode Island, also known as Old State House
 Old State Capitol (Kentucky), also called Old Statehouse
 Old State House (Boston), Massachusetts
 Old State House (Connecticut)
 Old State House (Little Rock, Arkansas)
 Old State House (Providence, Rhode Island)
 Old Statehouse (Dover, Delaware), listed on the National Register of Historic Places in Kent County, Delaware
 One of 5 former capitol buildings of Illinois, including:
 Old State Capitol State Historic Site (Illinois), Springfield — fifth Illinois state capitol
 Vandalia State House State Historic Site — fourth Illinois state capitol

See also
Old State Capitol (disambiguation)